"Nice to Meet Ya" is a song by American singer-songwriter Meghan Trainor featuring Trinidadian rapper Nicki Minaj. The third and final single of the former's third major-label studio album Treat Myself (2020), they were released on the same day. It was written by the artists alongside Scott Harris and production duo Ojivolta. Backed by an instrumentation of tingling drums and a hip hop beat, the pop and R&B song has feel-good and characteristically confident lyrics.

Music critics were mixed in their reception of the song. Commercially, "Nice to Meet Ya" charted at number 89 on the US Billboard Hot 100, becoming Trainor's 10th career entry. It also charted in Scotland, Ireland and the United Kingdom. Mathew Cullen directed the music video for "Nice to Meet Ya", which was inspired by Working Girl (1988), and featured Trainor performing dance routines with her female co-workers, and a pink-haired Minaj. Trainor has performed the song on The Tonight Show Starring Jimmy Fallon.

Background 
Meghan Trainor delayed her August 2018-scheduled third major-label studio album, Treat Myself, to January 25, 2019, because she wanted to add more songs to it, and removed it from iTunes that month. Trainor wrote a rough demo of "Nice to Meet Ya" and played it for her label, and according to her, all of Epic Records was like "oh my God, this one". She knew right away that the song was going to be a single, describing it as "the flame that [she] need[ed]" and a relative to "No" (2016).

Trainor stated in a January 2020 interview that Treat Myself would be an attempt to make a pop record that feels relevant in an era when hip-hop reigns, adding that she had written four albums worth of material trying to adapt to new trends in the music industry. Regarding her decision to have Nicki Minaj feature on "Nice to Meet Ya", Trainor stated that it was the "coolest thing" ever, adding that she worshipped the former since she was in middle school. According to Trainor, Minaj took the song to an "I'm a boss" level, and it felt "really awesome to be supported like that by awesome legends".

On January 22, 2020, Trainor began teasing the track by using the shaking-hands emoji as a placeholder for it on the track list of its parent album. She confirmed the song title as "Nice to Meet Ya", along with its release date and Minaj as the featured artist, six days later. The song was digitally released on January 31, alongside Treat Myself as the third single from it. It was serviced to hot adult contemporary radio in the United States on February 3, 2020, and mainstream radio in Australia. "Nice to Meet Ya" was sent to contemporary hit radio in the former country on February 4, and in Italy on March 20, 2020. A Remix EP to promote the song was released on May 22, 2020, featuring remixes of the song by Zookëper and Ape Drums.

Composition 

"Nice to Meet Ya" was written by Trainor, Raul Cubina, Mark Williams, Scott Harris and Nicki Minaj, with Ojivolta producing it. The song begins with an intro which is whispered by Trainor over bouncy beats and Minaj's grunts, the hip-hop infused song grows into a chorus where the beats pick up. It is a "feel-good" pop and R&B song with a "catchy chorus". Its production consists of tingling drums and a hip hop beat. Minaj delivers a rap verse which was described as "characteristically confident" by MTV News Madeline Roth. The verse includes "quotable" lyrics such as "I pop off 'cause I am the reigning champ" and "One minute I'm nice, the next, a monster".

Critical reception 
"Nice to Meet Ya" received mixed reviews from critics. Idolators Mike Nied referred to the song as the type of "self-assured banger" that Trainor and Minaj do "so well". He added that with a predictably fierce verse from the latter, it could become the first chart-dominating hit from the era. Calling it an R&B "bop" vaguely reminiscent of "No", Hannah Mylrea of NME stated that it injects a moment of energy on its parent album. Writing for The Arts Desk, Russ Coffey stated that "Nice to Meet Ya" pulls off outrageous hip-hop beats through its sheer chutzpah. Pitchforks Dani Blum named the song as the "most tolerable track" on Treat Myself, stating that it is engineered to be a banger but its "whisper of a chorus" is "harsh and irritating" and Minaj's verse is "mediocre". Jessica Brant of PopMatters wrote that it does not deviate sonically as much as it does lyrically, and questioned its feminist message as inauthentic.

Chart performance 
"Nice to Meet Ya" charted at number 89 on the US Billboard Hot 100 on the chart dated February 15, 2020, marking Trainor's 10th career entrance. At that time, it also gave Minaj her 107th charting song on the Hot 100, tying her with Kanye West as the artist with the fifth-most entries. The song reached number 88 on the UK Singles Chart. It peaked at number 88 on the Irish Singles Chart, and at number 45 in Scotland. "Nice to Meet Ya" reached number 29 on the Australia Digital Tracks chart, and number 13 on the New Zealand Hot Singles chart, an extension to the New Zealand Top 40 Singles chart.

Music video

Background 
The accompanying music video for "Nice to Meet Ya" was directed by Mathew Cullen. Trainor described the experience of the music video shoot, which was inspired by the American film Working Girl (1988), as "[her] moment", stating that it made her more nervous than being at the Grammys. She added that Minaj was "funny, really chill and hilarious" at the set. Trainor recalled that she had donned a big jacket because she was insecure about her arms, which the rapper asked her to take off. Minaj assured her that she looked good without it, which empowered the singer to "love [herself] in that moment". After completion of the shoot, Trainor cried and hugged crew members in disbelief about having worked with Minaj. The music video was released, to YouTube and Vevo, on January 31, 2020.

Synopsis and reception 
The music video depicts Trainor and her female co-workers performing dance routines at a male-dominated office. They sport bright pastel-colored pantsuits and '80s hairstyles, while performing a routine that involves twerking. Minaj is introduced when one of the men reads a business card that says "Boss Bitch Nicki Minaj", and depicts the name of the workplace as "Trainor Industries". The pink-haired rapper delivers her verse in a golden elevator, and is later joined by Trainor at her desk in a pink-colored office. In the final sequence, they are clad in Chanel attire for a business meeting.

The music video received positive reviews from critics. Idolators Mike Nied wrote that the video is brimming with bold costumes, a bit of choreography and so much personality, adding that it makes the song "even better". Writing for Billboard, Heran Mamo stated that "Trainor Industries", the fictitious workplace in the music video, stayed booked and busy for the successful shoot. Michael Saponara of the same magazine called it an "energetic clip", stating that the outfits in the video make for a pleasing aesthetic. Madeline Roth of MTV News thought that Minaj's pink hairdo ups the "boss bitch" factor of the visuals.

Live performances 
On February 6, 2020, Trainor performed the song for the first time on The Tonight Show Starring Jimmy Fallon. The performance featured a choreographed office space routine, where a group of backup dancers joined the singer to mirror the music video for "Nice to Meet Ya".

Track listing 
 Album version
 "Nice to Meet Ya" (featuring Nicki Minaj) – 3:17

Remix EP
 "Nice to Meet Ya" (featuring Nicki Minaj) (Zookëper Remix) – 2:30
 "Nice to Meet Ya" (featuring Nicki Minaj) (Ape Drums Remix) – 3:37
 "Nice to Meet Ya" (featuring Nicki Minaj) (Spotify bonus track) – 3:17

Personnel 
Credits adapted from the album liner notes, Treat Myself (2020).

 Meghan Trainorlead vocals, background vocals, songwriter
 Nicki Minajfeatured vocals, background vocals, songwriter
 Ojivoltaengineer, producer, programmer, recording engineer
 Raul Cubinasongwriter
 Mark Williamsbackground vocals, songwriter
 Scott Harrissongwriter
 Ryan Trainorbackground vocals

 Justin Trainorbackground vocals, engineer
 Daryl Sabarabackground vocals
 Aubry "Big Juice" Delainerecording engineer
 Jon Castellimixing engineer
 Ingmar Carlsonmixing engineer
 Dale Beckermastering engineer

Charts

Release history

References 

2020 singles
2020 songs
Meghan Trainor songs
Nicki Minaj songs
Songs written by Meghan Trainor
Songs written by Nicki Minaj
Songs written by Scott Harris (songwriter)
Epic Records singles